Ravi (Punjabi) is an administrative zone in Lahore, Punjab, Pakistan. 

It forms one of 10 zones of the Lahore metropolitan area and is named after the Ravi River.

References

Zones in Lahore